"Harder" is a song by English DJ Jax Jones and American singer-songwriter Bebe Rexha, released on 12 July 2019. It is the ninth single from Jones's debut EP Snacks (2018), and was also included on his debut studio album, Snacks (Supersize) (2019). The music video for the song was released on 31 July 2019. The song was released to top 40 radio on 13 August 2019, and spent 14 weeks on the UK Singles Chart.

Critical reception
Jason Lipshutz of Billboard called the song a "dance-pop opus" and a "quick ray of sun" with "whirring beats" that "continues Rexha down a promising path".

Promotion
Jones shared a snippet of the song on 9 July, asking fans who they thought was singing on it. He revealed the collaboration in another post on 10 July.

Music video
The music video for the song was released on 31 July and was directed by Sophie Muller. The video features Bebe Rexha on the day of her wedding and her fighting with her husband-to be and glancing at the wedding singer (Jax Jones).

Track listing

Charts

Weekly charts

Year-end charts

Certifications

Release history

References

External links
 
 
 

2019 singles
2019 songs
Bebe Rexha songs
Jax Jones songs
Songs written by Jax Jones
Songs written by Kamille (musician)
Songs written by Steve Mac
Songs written by Bebe Rexha
Song recordings produced by Steve Mac
Song recordings produced by Jax Jones